Sellappuliyage Lucian Benedict Rosa (better known as SLB Rosa, born February 11, 1944) is a former Sri Lankan long-distance runner. He represented Sri Lanka at the 1972 Summer Olympics held in Munich, Germany. He is best known for running barefooted and winning a 5000 metres and the 10,000 metres double at the 1970 Asian Games held in Bangkok, Thailand. His performance in 10,000 metres was also an Asian Games record.

At the Asian Games in Bangkok in 1966, he won the bronze medal in both 5000 metres and 10,000 metres. His personal best performance in the 10,000 metres, 29:18.0 minutes, still stands as the Sri Lankan national record since 1975.  Born in Kandy, Rosa started his athletic career at Roman Catholic School, Ampitiya. Later he joined the Army and continued to pursue athletics. He led the Sri Lankan team in the 1972 Olympics but could not compete in the 1976 edition due to Sri Lanka boycotting the Montreal Olympics. He was in Ceylon Olympic squad in 1968 but country sent only a three-man team, which did not include Lucian, to Mexico due to financial difficulties.

Rosa is a University of Wisconsin–Parkside Hall of Famer, and a men's cross-country and track coach from 1977-2007. Lucian Rosa Invitational is named after him.

References

External links
 

1944 births
Living people
People from Kandy
Sri Lankan male long-distance runners
Olympic athletes of Sri Lanka
Athletes (track and field) at the 1972 Summer Olympics
Asian Games gold medalists for Sri Lanka
Asian Games bronze medalists for Sri Lanka
Asian Games medalists in athletics (track and field)
Athletes (track and field) at the 1966 Asian Games
Athletes (track and field) at the 1970 Asian Games
Sri Lankan Roman Catholics
Medalists at the 1966 Asian Games
Medalists at the 1970 Asian Games